State Route 174 (SR 174) is a  L-shaped state highway in the northeastern part of the U.S. state of Georgia. Its routing exists within portions of Madison and Franklin counties.

Route description
SR 174 begins at an intersection with SR 106 northeast of Ila, in Madison County. It heads northeast to an intersection with US 29/SR 8, where the three highways begin a concurrency to the northeast. Just before the concurrency ends they cross the Hudson River and enter Franklin County. After entering the county, SR 174 splits off to the northwest and meets its northern terminus, an intersection with SR 51 west of Franklin Springs.

Major intersections

See also

References

External links

 Georgia Roads (Routes 161 - 180)

174
Transportation in Madison County, Georgia
Transportation in Franklin County, Georgia